Navy Heights is an unincorporated community in Clatsop County, Oregon, United States. It began as a housing project in nearby Astoria.

References

Unincorporated communities in Clatsop County, Oregon
Oregon populated places on the Columbia River
Unincorporated communities in Oregon